Jeanne-Mance–Viger is a provincial electoral district in the Montreal region of Quebec, Canada that elects members to the National Assembly of Quebec. It corresponds exactly to the territory of the Saint-Léonard borough of the city of Montreal. The current MNA is Filomenna Rotiroti who was first elected in 2008. 

It was created for the 2003 election from Jeanne-Mance and part of Viger and has remained a Liberal stronghold ever since. It is the safest Liberal electoral district in Montreal's east end.

In the change from the 2001 to the 2011 electoral map, its territory was unchanged. It borders the electoral districts of Viau to west, Anjou-Louis Riel to the east and southeast, Rosemont to the southwest, and Bourassa-Sauve to the north.

It was named for Jeanne Mance and jointly for Denis-Benjamin Viger and Jacques Viger (1787–1858).

Members of the National Assembly

Election results

|}

|}

|}

^ Change is from redistributed results. CAQ change is from ADQ. 

|-
 
|Liberal
|Filomena Rotiroti
|align="right"|16433
|align="right"|73.05
|align="right"|

|-
}
|Independent
|Katia Proulx
|align="right"|281
|align="right"|1.25
|align="right"|
|-

|-
|||||Total valid votes
|align="right"|22,497
|align="right"|98.57
|-
|||||Total rejected ballots
|align="right"|326
|align="right"|1.43
|-
|||||Turnout
|align="right"|22,823
|align="right"|46.95
|-
|||||Electors on the lists
|align="right"|48,609

|-
 
|Liberal
|Michel Bissonnet
|align="right"|20716
|align="right"|68.00
|align="right"|-11.89

|-

|-

|-
|||||Total valid votes
|align="right"|30,466
|align="right"|98.87
|-
|||||Total rejected ballots
|align="right"|349
|align="right"|1.13
|-
|||||Turnout
|align="right"|30,815
|align="right"|63.26
|-
|||||Electors on the lists
|align="right"|48,710

|-
 
|Liberal
|Michel Bissonnet
|align="right"|26801
|align="right"|79.89
|align="right"|

|-

|}

References

External links
Information
 Elections Quebec

Election results
 Election results (National Assembly)

Maps
 2011 map (PDF)
 2001 map (Flash)
2001–2011 changes (Flash)
1992–2001 changes to Jeanne-Mance (Flash)
1992–2001 changes to Viger (Flash)
 Electoral map of Montréal region
 Quebec electoral map, 2011

Provincial electoral districts of Montreal
Quebec provincial electoral districts
Saint-Leonard, Quebec